Several research and polling firms conducted polls during the parliamentary term and prior to the 2016 Australian federal election on 2 July in relation to voting intention for the Australian House of Representatives (lower house) and leader ratings. Most firms use the flow of preferences at the previous election to determine the two-party-preferred vote; others ask respondents to nominate their second preference before applying the preference flows at the previous election.

Every federal election after 1961 has been won by the grouping that also won the majority of federal seats in New South Wales. Unusually, in the upcoming election nearly half of all marginal government seats are in NSW; of these, nearly half are in Western Sydney and half are in rural and regional areas. No more than a few government seats in each other state are marginal.

Assuming a theoretical uniform swing, for the Labor opposition to get to 76 seats and majority government would require at least 50.5 percent of the two-party vote (a 4.0-point two-party swing or greater), while for the incumbent Coalition to lose majority government would require 50.2 percent of the two-party vote (a 3.3-point two-party swing or greater).

Graphical aggregate of national voting intention polling

Federal two-party-preferred polling aggregates by state
The table below published by The Poll Bludger sets out the final release of federal two-party-preferred polling aggregates by state/territory (and swings since the previous election).

Source: BludgerTrack 1 Jul 2016: Poll Bludger – Methodology – State 2PP history

National polling

Voting intention

Preferred prime minister and satisfaction

Individual seat polling

Notes

References

Opinion polling, national
2016
Australia